Aloidendron sabaeum is a species of flowering plant in the subfamily Asphodeloideae. It is native to Saudi Arabia and Yemen.

References

Asphodeloideae